Orlando World Center Marriott is a hotel and convention center near Orlando, Florida. The resort, which is close to Walt Disney World, is located off of World Center Drive, which was renamed from International Drive to the resort's namesake after the southern extension of International Drive was built.

Resort property
Marriott's Orlando World Center opened on March 24, 1986. At the time it was the largest hotel in Florida, and it is now the largest Marriott in the world. The 2,008-room, 28-story building contains a nine-story lobby atrium,  and also has the largest pillar-free ballroom in the world featuring  of meeting space. The  resort property is also home to the 18-hole Hawk's Landing Golf Course, and the Marriott Vacation Club resorts of Marriott's Sabal Palms, Marriott's Royal Palms and Marriott's Imperial Palm Villas.

In 2002, the hotel completed building a brand new 500-room tower, making the hotel the world's largest Marriott.

In 2007, the hotel added 104,000 square feet of meeting space called the Cypress Ballroom which now connects with the Convention Center.

In 2008, the resort was awarded Green Lodging certification by the Florida Department of Environmental Protection.

In the Nickelodeon show Get the Picture, winning contestants could win trips to the Orlando Marriott World Center. Photos of the resort circa 1991–1993 can be seen on the show.

Marriott currently partners with Encore Event Technologies to provide in-house audiovisual services to guests, corporations, and hotel staff.

AFPAC Conference 
In 2022, the resort hosted the America First Political Action Conference, a gathering promoting white-nationalist and far-right ideology.

References

External links 
Orlando Marriott World Center 
Orlando Marriott World Center Website - Marriott

Hotels in Orlando, Florida
Convention centers in Florida
Resorts in Florida
Marriott hotels
Skyscrapers in Orlando, Florida
Skyscraper hotels in Florida